Martin Vlach is an engineer at Mentor Graphics in Portland, Oregon. He was named a Fellow of the Institute of Electrical and Electronics Engineers (IEEE) in 2014 for his work in analog and mixed signal hardware description languages and their simulation tools.

References

Fellow Members of the IEEE
Living people
Year of birth missing (living people)
Place of birth missing (living people)